Michael Schiefel (born 1970 in Münster, West Germany) is a jazz and experimental singer.

He studied in Berlin University of the Arts and graduated in 1996 with a High Honours Diplom in vocal jazz and music education. He is currently a professor of jazz vocal in the Franz Liszt Conservatory of Music in Weimar, a position he has held since 2001.

Discography

Solo albums 

 1997: Invisible Loop
 2001: I Don't Belong
 2006: Don't Touch My Animals
 2010: My Home Is My Tent

With Jazz Indeed
 1996: Under Water
 1998: Who the Moon Is
 2005: Blaue Augen

External links
 Official Website
 Michael Schiefel on MySpace

1970 births
Living people
German jazz singers
21st-century German  male singers